West Thornton Primary School is a primary school with academy status for pupils aged between 4 and 11 years. The school is located on Rosecourt Road, near Purley Way and off the Lombard roundabout in the London Borough of Croydon. The school caters for pupils from Reception to Year 6. The school is close to the border of Croydon and the London Borough of Merton. It is also close to Croydon Cemetery. The school was founded in 1896 as the Boston Road Schools (Infants, Junior Girls, Junior Boys).

There are currently 615 pupils who attend the school. An Ofsted report, released in November 2007, stated that "West Thornton Primary is a good and improving school with a number of outstanding features." and that "The driving force behind the school's success is the headteacher who provides inspirational leadership and has a very clear vision of what primary school education should be." The overall grade was 2 with a few areas rated as Outstanding (1)

References

External links
Official Website
West Thornton Primary School - London Borough of Croydon
Performance Tables

Primary schools in the London Borough of Croydon
Academies in the London Borough of Croydon